Gustavo Fernandes (born February 19, 1998) is an American soccer player who plays as a defender for North Carolina FC in USL League One. His older brother Leo plays for the Tampa Bay Rowdies and his twin brother Gabriel plays for the Stony Brook Seawolves.

Career

Forward Madison
After impressing during Forward Madison's February pre-season training camp, Fernandes signed for the club in March 2020. He made his league debut for the club on July 25, 2020 against North Texas.

North Carolina FC
On February 24, 2022, Fernandes moved to USL League One side North Carolina FC ahead of their upcoming 2022 season.

References

External links
Gustavo Fernandes at Stony Brook Athletics

1998 births
Living people
Ocean City Nor'easters players
Forward Madison FC players
North Carolina FC players
USL League Two players
USL League One players
American soccer players
Soccer players from New York (state)
Sportspeople from Suffolk County, New York
Association football defenders
People from West Babylon, New York
Tampa Bay Rowdies U23 players
Stony Brook Seawolves men's soccer players
American people of Brazilian descent
Iowa Western Reivers men's soccer players